In organic chemistry, a 1,3-dipolar compound or 1,3-dipole is a dipolar compound with delocalized electrons and a separation of charge over three atoms. They are reactants in 1,3-dipolar cycloadditions.

Known 1,3-dipoles are:
 Azides
 Ozone
 Nitro compounds
 Diazo compounds
 Some oxides
 Azoxide compounds (RN(O)NR)
 Carbonyl oxides (Criegee zwitterions)
 Nitrile oxides
 Nitrous oxide
 Nitrones

 Some imines:
 Azomethine imine
 Nitrilimines (analogous to nitrile oxide)
 Carbonyl imines
 Some ylides
 Azomethine ylide
 Nitrile ylide
 Carbonyl ylide
 Thiosulfines

References

Organic chemistry